Harry Haldane (13 July 1865 – 12 August 1951) was an Australian cricketer. He played in eleven first-class matches for South Australia between 1886 and 1894.

See also
 List of South Australian representative cricketers

References

External links
 

1865 births
1951 deaths
Australian cricketers
South Australia cricketers
Cricketers from Adelaide